Grupo Abril (simply also known as Abril)  is a Brazilian media conglomerate headquartered in São Paulo. The company is the holding company of Editora Abril, which publishes the weekly newsmagazine Veja.

History and profile
Victor Civita, an Italian businessman, founded Editora Abril in 1950, which was the first publisher of Walt Disney comics in Brazil. He also published other comics and books. Gradually, he developed magazines for specific markets. In the 1960s, with his son Roberto Civita, he expanded to publishing several market-specific magazines, such as Quatro Rodas, Claudia, and others. Veja, the weekly newsmagazine, was founded in 1968 and led by the younger Civita.

Abril had several partnerships in the emerging Brazilian pay TV market during the 90s, including local franchises of American channels such as Disney, MTV and ESPN. The company also entered in cable TV provider service with TVA and in the satellite television market with local version of HD TV.

With exception of MTV and TVA, all properties were sold until beginning of the 2000s. In 2007, Fiz TV and Ideal channels were launched in an effort to return to the pay TV market, but was a failure and the project was discontinued in 2009. Later, TVA was completely sold to Telefónica in 2012, MTV brand was returned to Viacom and its broadcast network was sold to Grupo Spring, which publishes the Brazilian edition of Rolling Stones, in the end of 2013.

Grupo Abril also is the owner of Fernando Chinaglia, the largest distributor of publications in Latin America, acquired in 2007.

In addition to its media interests, the group has entered the education market, with assets that produce many curriculum and instructional materials, including internet applications.

Today, the group is chaired by Fábio Barbosa, after the death of Roberto Civita on May 26, 2013.

Assets

Abril Mídia

Magazines
Veja
Superinteressante (Brazilian version of Muy Interesante)
Mundo Estranho (Superinteressante spinoff)
Aventuras na História (Superinteressante spinoff)
Exame
VIP
Placar
Capricho
Quatro Rodas
Nova (Brazilian version of Cosmopolitan)
Estilo de Vida (Brazilian version of InStyle)
Elle
Claudia
Manequim
Boa Forma
Saúde! É Vital
Caras
Casa Claudia
Arquitetura & Construção
Minha Casa
Recreio
Vida Simples

Television
TVA (joint venture with Telefónica)
Ideal (originally closed due to low carriage and viewership, however, returned in October 2013, replacing MTV Brasil)

Out-of-home advertising
Rede Elemídia

Abril Educação

Publishers
Editora Ática

Teaching systems
Anglo
Ser
GEO
Sistema Farias Brito

Courses and Colleges
Anglo Vestibulares
Colégio pH
Alfacon Concursos
Colegio Sigma

English
Red Balloon

New Business
Sistema de Ensino Técnico ETB
Ei Você
Edumobi
Alfacon - Preparatório para Concursos
Escola Satélite

Past assets
MTV Brasil Ltda. (before named MTV Brasil, in 2005 change by enterprise Abril Radiodifusão)
MTV Brasil (was replaced after the business was returned to Viacom in October 2013)
Listel (sold to BellSouth, now part of Carvajal-owned Publicar)
Disney Channel (stake sold to Disney Channel Brazil)
UOL (with operations to Grupo Folha)
Abril Vídeo (closed in 1999, replaced with Brazilian subsidiaries of Walt Disney Studios Home Entertainment and 20th Century Fox Home Entertainment)
Abril Music (record label operated between 1998 and 2003, ceased operations due to competition from major record companies)
Bravo Brasil (a joint venture with the American cable network Bravo, currently Pramer-owned Film&Arts)
CMT Brasil (the Brazilian version of Country Music Television, a joint venture with the network closed in 2002)
Fiz (closed due to low carriage and viewership, concept lives through Fiz na MTV)
BRZ (between 2012 and 2014)

Abril Vídeo
Abril Vídeo was a home video division for TV shows, videos and movies on VHS. Began operation on April 6, 1983 and closed in 1999. It distributed Brazilian tapes of The Walt Disney Company and 20th Century Fox movies.

References

External links
 Abril website

 
Privately held companies of Brazil
Mass media companies of Brazil
1950 establishments in Brazil
Mass media companies established in 1950